Nagarpur is an upazila of Tangail District in the Division of Dhaka, Bangladesh. Nagarpur Thana was established in 1905 and was converted into an upazila in 1983.

Geography
The total area of the Upazila is 266.7 km2.

Demographics
As of the 2011 Bangladesh census, Nagarpur has a population of 288092. There are  households 66523 in total. Nagarpur Town has an area of 4.68 km2. The town has a population of 13110; male 51.25%, female 48.75%; density of population is 2801 per km2.

Administration
Nagarpur Upazila is divided into 12 union parishads: Bekra, Bhadra, Bharra, Dhubaria, Duptiair, Gayhata, Mamudnagar, Moka, Nagarpur, Pakutia, Sahabatpur, and Salimabad. The union parishads are subdivided into 212 mauzas and 245 villages.

Education
Nagarpur has an average literacy rate of 42.7% (Male-46.3%, Female-39.6%).

See also
Upazilas of Bangladesh
Districts of Bangladesh
Divisions of Bangladesh
Union Councils of Tangail District

References

Upazilas of Tangail District